Lycée Français de Palma (LFP) is a French international school in [Sa Teulera] (ES/CA), Palma de Mallorca, Spain. It teaches all levels, age 2 to 18, from Kindergarten (Toute Petite Section) to high school.

As of 2019 the school has over 540 students. The secondary school is located on Carrer Lluis Fabregas  while the main building, housing kindergarten and primary classes, is on Carrer de la Salut.

See also
 Liceo Español Luis Buñuel, a Spanish international school near Paris, France

References

External links
  Lycée Français de Palma
  Lycée Français de Palma
(in French) Mission Laique Française 

French international schools in Spain
Palma de Mallorca